Guémené-Penfao is a commune in the Loire-Atlantique department in western France, north of Nantes. The commune is widespread and includes the former communes of Beslé-sur-Vilaine and Guénouvry.

Its name comes from the Breton language: "gwen" (white), "menez" (hill, mountain), "pen" (head), and "faou" (beech tree). The main economic activity is agriculture.

Population

See also
Communes of the Loire-Atlantique department

References

Communes of Loire-Atlantique